Arne Sande (18 March 1905 – 31 May 1985) was a Danish boxer who competed in the 1928 Summer Olympics.

In 1932 he was eliminated in the first round of the welterweight class after losing his fight to Patrick Lenehan.

External links

1905 births
Year of death missing
Welterweight boxers
Olympic boxers of Denmark
Boxers at the 1928 Summer Olympics
Danish male boxers